Juan-Martín Aranguren and Franco Ferreiro were the defending champions, but they chose to not compete together.
Aranguren partnered with Sebastián Decoud, but they lost to Ricardo Hocevar and João Souza in the quarterfinal.
Ferreiro decided to play with Ricardo Mello. They reached the final, when they won 6–3, 6–3, against Diego Junqueira and David Marrero.

Seeds

Draw

Draw

References
 Doubles Draw

Copa Petrobras Sao Paulo - Doubles
Copa Petrobras São Paulo